José Padilla Sánchez (28 May 1889 in Almería – 25 October 1960 in Madrid), popularly known as Maestro Padilla was a famous Spanish composer and pianist. He was best known for the songs La Violetera and El Relicario, popularized by cuplé singer Raquel Meller, and the pasodoble Valencia

He became famous in France as he composed songs for the Moulin Rouge, like Ça c'est Paris. La Violetera was adapted by Charlie Chaplin for the soundtrack of City Lights (1931).

Biography 
José Padilla Sánchez was born in Almería in 1889. He took his first music lessons from Almería´s Municipal Band director and at fourteen he produced his first written music sheet titled Las dos palomas. By the time he lived in Madrid, he attended the Real Conservatorio de Música y Declamación. Also, he became acquainted with remarcable Zarzuela composers such as Tomás Bretón, Gerónimo Giménez y Amadeo Vives.

At 23 he moves Barcelona and from there to Buenos Aires and works as director for the Úrsula López Band. Later on he moved back to Barcelona and composed his popular El Relicario and La violetera. Next he moves to Paris and his works are performed in the  Folies Bergere and Moulin Rouge music halls where his Ça c´est Paris sung by Mistinguett becomes very popular. In 1928 he signed a 25 million franc contract to travel to Argentina. There he produced works with Carlos Gardel.

In 1949, al 60 returns to Madrid to a house that, after his death in 1960 held his museum.
]

Selected filmography
 Valencia (1927)
 Imperial Violets (1932)
 The Angel with the Trumpet (1948)
 In the Arms of the Sea (1951)
 The Lovers of Midnight (1953)

Legacy 
There is a commemorative plaque in his Paris residence. Also, in 1992 the Maestro Padilla Auditorium was built in home town Almería. There is a garden named Jardín Maestro Padilla in the Arganzuela district of  Madrid.

External links 
 Jose Padilla.org

References

1889 births
1960 deaths
20th-century pianists
20th-century Spanish composers
20th-century Spanish male musicians
People from Almería
Spanish composers
Spanish male composers
Spanish pianists